Esmond Mountain is a summit in the U.S. state of Oregon.

Esmond Mountain was named after Edwin Esmond, a pioneer settler.

References

Mountains of Jackson County, Oregon
Mountains of Oregon